Shot Caller may refer to:

Shot Caller (film), a 2017 film
"Shot Caller" (Ian Carey song), a 2009 song by Ian Carey
"Shot Caller" (song), a 2012  song by French Montana